Java Head or Tanjung Layar, is a prominent cape at the extreme western end of Java.

Java Head may also refer to:

 Java Head (novel), a novel by Joseph Hergesheimer
 Java Head (1923 film), an American adaptation
 Java Head (1934 film), a British adaptation

See also
 South by Java Head, a 1957 novel